Yun Seung-hyun (born 1 June 1994) is a South Korean athlete specialising in the high jump. He represented his country at the 2016 Summer Olympics without qualifying for the final.

His personal bests in the event are 2.32 metres outdoors (Yeosu 2015) and 2.25 metres indoors (Manhattan 2016).

International competitions

References

1994 births
Living people
South Korean male high jumpers
Olympic athletes of South Korea
Athletes (track and field) at the 2016 Summer Olympics
Athletes (track and field) at the 2014 Asian Games
Asian Games competitors for South Korea
Competitors at the 2013 Summer Universiade
Competitors at the 2015 Summer Universiade
21st-century South Korean people